Buprestoidea is a superfamily of beetles.

It contains two families:
 Buprestidae Leach 1815, the jewel beetles or metallic wood-boring beetles.
 Schizopodidae LeConte 1861

References

External links
 
 

 
Beetle superfamilies